Ilia Sergeyevich Klimkin (born 15 August 1980) is a Russian former competitive figure skater. He is the 2003 Grand Prix Final silver medalist, the 2004 European bronze medalist, the 1999 World Junior champion, and a three-time Russian national silver medalist.

Personal life 
Klimkin was born on 15 August 1980 in Moscow, Russian SFSR, Soviet Union.

Career 
Klimkin's grandmother introduced him to skating at the age of four because she felt it would be good for his health. He was coached by Igor Rusakov for thirteen years until Rusakov's sudden death in July 2003. He was then coached by Viktor Kudriavtsev.

At the 1999 Nebelhorn Trophy, Klimkin became the first skater to land two different quadruple jumps in one program, which he did by landing a quad salchow and a quad toe loop in the free skate. Klimkin spins in both directions, and is also known for his cantilever.

In the summer of 2003, Klimkin had a calf injury which became infected and required three surgeries; he returned to the ice in late September and won 2002 NHK Trophy two months later. In the fall of 2004, he underwent surgery on his Achilles tendon, keeping him off the ice for four months; after another three months, he was able to practice jumps. He did not compete in the 2004–05 season. 

He announced his retirement from competitive skating on 19 April 2007.

Programs

Results 
GP: Grand Prix; JGP: Junior Grand Prix

References

External links 

 

1980 births
Living people
Russian male single skaters
Figure skaters at the 2006 Winter Olympics
Olympic figure skaters of Russia
Figure skaters from Moscow
European Figure Skating Championships medalists
World Junior Figure Skating Championships medalists